= Old Towne Inn =

Coordinates: 38°49′0.2″N 76°44′59.5″W

The Olde Towne Inn (“O.T.I”) is a restaurant located in Upper Marlboro, Maryland, USA, previously known as the Judges Chambers. Since 2006 the restaurant has been owned by chef and restaurateur, Donnell Long, an African American and Washington, DC native.

== History ==
The Old Towne Inn was established by Donnell Long in 2006. Before then, the building had long served as a restaurant called the Judges Chambers due to its proximity to the Prince George's county seat in Upper Marlboro, MD. The building is located on Main Street, Upper Marlboro, and is next door to the county courthouse and country administration facilities. Due to its location, the building has been as a main gathering place for county officials for over 80 years, catering to judges, lawyers, policemen, and administrators

Until the passage of the 1964 Civil Rights Act, the Judges Chambers had been segregated and remained unofficially so for long after. Through the 1970s the restaurant refused to serve black customers, including then-sitting Judge James H. Taylor, the first African American circuit court judge in Prince George's County, Maryland. African American patrons, including Judge Taylor, were only allowed to enter through the back door.

In 2006, Donnell Long took over the lease of the Olde Town Inn. He then renovated the restaurant, installing wine-colored leather seating, Tiffany chandeliers, and marble tables. The restaurant now seats around 75 people, with an outdoor patio that can hold an additional 35 patrons. It continues to serves as a cornerstone socializing establishment and regularly serves local politicians, actors, and professional athletes.

The restaurant currently focuses on casual, American home-style cooking and seafood dishes infused with regional flavors.
